NW Avia was an airline based at Peski (airport) in Petrozavodsk. It was the only air company in the Republic of Karelia. Its main purpose was aerial fire-fighting (for which it is licensed, it was part of Avialesookhrana) although it did perform other typical aerial services (including pipeline and forest patrols, medical flights and search-and-rescue), scheduled and charter passenger flights (commenced in 2009) and charter cargo services. NW Avia was undergoing reorganization with massive debts (~10 million rubles, it peaked at ~22 million rubles) and was the largest debtor in the Republic of Karelia. The airlines ceased to exist on July 1, 2014.

Destinations

Petrozavodsk, Kizhi

Fleet

External links

 Homepage (in Russian)

References

Defunct airlines of Russia
Companies based in the Republic of Karelia